This is a list of the top 50 National Football League (NFL) players by total career regular season passing touchdowns. 

Tom Brady holds the record for most passing touchdowns with 649 and most playoff touchdown passes with 88.

Aaron Rodgers leads all active players with 475 career passing touchdowns.

Regular season career passing touchdowns leaders

Through  season.

Historical passing touchdowns leaders

Sixteen players are recognized as having held outright or tied the record as the NFL's career passing touchdowns leader. The longest record holder was Fran Tarkenton who held the record for 20 years from 1975 to 1994.

See also
 List of National Football League playoffs career passing touchdowns leaders
 List of National Football League annual passing touchdowns leaders
 List of gridiron football quarterbacks passing statistics
 List of National Football League career passing completions leaders
 List of National Football League career passing yards leaders
 List of National Football League career quarterback wins leaders
 List of National Football League records (individual)

Notes

References
General
NFL Passing Leaders – complete list
Pro-football-reference.com enumeration of career passing leaders

Footnotes

Passing
Passing touchdowns leaders

National Football League lists